The Rock-A-Teens were a short-lived United States rockabilly group from Richmond, Virginia, active in the late 1950s, led by Vic Mizelle.

The Rock-a-Teens were one-hit wonders whose lone hit record was "Woo Hoo", written by George Donald McGraw and backed with "Untrue", released on Roulette Records R 4192. The song hit No. 16 on the Billboard Hot 100.

Career
The Rock-A-Teens formed in 1956 as Boo Walke & the Rockets while still in high school. After the initial success of "Woo-Hoo", they cut an album of the same name. Meanwhile Roulette Records issued a follow-up single of "Twangy" and "Doggone It Baby". Neither the album or follow-up single was successful. The group broke up shortly after and none of the members continued in the music business. Vic Mizelle went on with other Richmond groups for years.

Discography

Album
Woo Hoo (1960)  Roulette Records SR 25109 - Recorded November 1959 and Spring 1960.
Track Listing
"Woo-Hoo" (George Donald McGraw) - 2:05
"Doggone It Baby" (Victor Mizelle) - 2:23
"I'm Not Afraid" (Mizelle) - 2:15
"That's My Mama" (Billy Smith) - 1:41
"Dance To the Bop" (Floyd Edge) - 2:23
"Story Of A Woman" (Mizelle) - 2:00
"Twangy" (Bobby "Boo" Walker) - 2:00
"Janis Will Rock" (Mizelle) - 2:27
"Pagan" (Mizelle) - 2:08
"Lotta Boppin'" (Mizelle) - 2:23
"Oh My Nerves" (Walker) - 2:07
"I Was Born To Rock" (Mizelle) - 2:32

Technical Staff
Producer – Joe Reisman

Singles
"Woo Hoo" (McGraw) / "Untrue" (Mizelle), Roulette  R-4192 - 1959
"Twangy" (Walker) / "Doggone It Baby" (Mizelle), Roulette R-4217 - 1959

Original members
Vic Mizelle (vocals, guitar) (died 2017)
Bobby "Boo" Walke (guitar) (died 1998)
Bill Cook (guitar) (died 1971)
Eddie Robinson (sax) 
Paul Dixon (bass) (died 2007)
Bill Smith (drums)

References

External links
 BlackCat Rockabilly Europe, search for The Rock-A-Teens.  Retrieved November 8, 2009

1956 establishments in Virginia
Music of Richmond, Virginia
Musical groups established in 1956
Rock music groups from Virginia
Rockabilly music groups